Modus is the debut album by Modus, released on OPUS in 1979.

Track listing

Official releases
 1979: Modus, LP, MC, OPUS, #9116 0856
 1995: Modus, CD, re-release, Open Music #0017 2331
 2000: Modus: Komplet 2, 3 bonus tracks, CD, Bonton Music Slovakia, #9849 1722
 2008: Modus: Slovenské legendárne albumy II, CD, SME,  #91 0023

Credits and personnel
 Ján Lehotský - lead vocal, chorus, writer, keyboards
 Marika Gombitová - lead vocal, chorus
 Miroslav Žbirka - writer, lead vocal, chorus, electric and acoustic guitar
 Ladislav Lučenič - bass, electric and acoustic guitar, chorus
 Viliam Pobjecký - solo guitar
 Kamil Peteraj - lyrics, notes
 Boris Filan - lyrics
 Tibor Borský - photography
 Ján Lauko - producer
 Juraj Filo - sound director
 Štefan Danko - responsible editor

Accolades
In 2007, Modus was ranked 41st on the list of the 100 Greatest Slovak Albums of All Time.

Export release

The export version of the album, also entitled Modus, was issued in 1980.

Track listing

Official releases
 1980: Modus, LP, MC, OPUS, #9113 0974
 2008: Slnečný kalendár: 2CD Collectors Edition, bonus CD, OPUS, #91 2792

References

General

Specific

External links 
 

1979 debut albums
1980 albums
Modus (band) albums